= Wigan F.C. =

Wigan F.C. may refer to:

- Wigan Warriors, rugby league club originally named Wigan Football Club
- Wigan Athletic F.C., association football club
